Oregon Route 10 is an Oregon state highway which serves Portland and some of its western suburbs.

Route description
OR 10 begins as Naito Parkway in Downtown Portland starting where Naito Parkway interchanges with U.S. Route 26.  It heads south out of downtown, multiplexed with Oregon Route 99W.  After passing under the Portland Aerial Tram, Naito Parkway ends at an interchange with Barbur Boulevard; the two routes continue south out of Portland on Barbur.  OR 10 separates from OR 99W a few miles south of downtown, and proceeds along Capitol Highway through the Portland neighborhood of Hillsdale. Along here, it is a surface street, which cuts through the southern part of Portland's West Hills.  It separates from Capitol Highway in Hillsdale, which continues unnumbered, and becomes the Beaverton-Hillsdale Highway, highway number 40, a surface street with frequent traffic signals. The highway continues west into Washington County.

In the community of Raleigh Hills, OR 10 intersects with Oregon Route 210 (locally known as Scholls Ferry Road), which heads southwest towards Progress, Tigard, and Scholls.  OR 10 continues west into Beaverton, where it interchanges with Oregon Route 217, a freeway.  West of that interchange, the street name changes to Farmington Road, the eastern part of which is not a state highway, and comes a block parallel with Oregon Route 8 in front of Beaverton High School.  The portion of OR 10 from downtown Beaverton to the intersection with Oregon Route 219 was once known as Oregon Route 208.  OR 8 and 10 do not intersect, but it is not uncommon for commuters to use the frontage road for the OR 217 interchange or another surface street to change between the routes. As Farmington Road, OR 10 leaves Beaverton and cuts across half-developed suburbia to Farmington and its intersection with OR 219.  This final section comprises the Farmington Highway, highway number 142.

Major intersections

References

 
 

010
Transportation in Portland, Oregon
Transportation in Beaverton, Oregon
Transportation in Multnomah County, Oregon
1932 establishments in Oregon